α-Spinasterol is a stigmastane-type phytosterol found in a variety of plant sources such as spinach, from which it gets its name.

The chemical was recently found in Gordonia ceylanica, the first time that this chemical was found in the Gordonia species.

See also
 Chondrillasterol 24R isomer
 Stigmasterol 5,22-dien isomer

References

Further reading

Sterols